RJAM may refer to:
 Minami Torishima Airport (ICAO airport code)
 Rabha Jatiya Aikya Manch, political party in Assam, India